Stephen James Morgan (born 17 January 1981) is a British Labour Party politician who has been the Member of Parliament (MP) for Portsmouth South since the 2017 general election.

Early life
Morgan is originally from Fratton, a district of Portsmouth; where he attended local state schools including the comprehensive Priory School (at which he was Deputy Head Boy) in Southsea and then Portsmouth College in Baffins. He studied politics and sociology at the University of Bristol before gaining a master's degree in politics at Goldsmiths in London.

Morgan has been chair of Portsmouth Cultural Consortium, a resident-led group committed to improving the city through cultural regeneration, vice chair of Age UK Portsmouth and a governor at Arundel Court Junior School and his former secondary, Priory School.

Before going into politics,  Morgan's career was in local government working at Portsmouth City Council, later becoming Head of Community Engagement for the Royal Borough of Kensington and Chelsea. From 2015 until the snap general election of 2017, he was CEO of Basingstoke Voluntary Action. This role allowed him to run for public office for the first time and in May 2016 he became the councillor for Charles Dickens, a central ward in Portsmouth City Council. Later that year, he became the Leader of the Portsmouth Labour Group.

Parliamentary career
On 8 June 2017, a snap general election called by Prime Minister Theresa May was held, in which he defeated the incumbent Conservative MP Flick Drummond for Portsmouth South by a majority of 1,554 and a swing of 9.4% from Conservative to Labour increasing the share of the vote by 21.5%, one of the largest increases in the country. This makes him the first member of his party to represent the seat since its creation in 1918. In his victory speech Morgan said: "Portsmouth had voted for hope". He later said: "It has been a dream of mine to be an MP ever since I joined the party at the age of 16." In the general election of December 2019, Morgan more than trebled his majority, again recording one of the country's highest increases in Labour's share of the vote at 7.6%.

In Parliament, Morgan has served as Parliamentary Private Secretary (PPS) to Andrew Gwynne, the Shadow Secretary of State for Communities and Local Government, and on the Public Accounts Committee. From July 2019 until April 2020, he served in the Shadow Communities and Local Government team as a Shadow Minister. The brief included policy areas such as adult social care, children's services, faith and community cohesion, welfare reform and debt services to community pubs.

Morgan says his priorities are tackling crime, standing up for schools, investment in the NHS, being a strong voice on defence and addressing climate change. Morgan frequently speaks out on veterans’ issues citing Portsmouth's naval history and his own grandfather's military service as his motivation. On 3 April 2019 he hosted a Westminster Hall debate calling on the government to take further action on reducing veteran suicide. During the debate Morgan called on the Government to begin recording veterans' suicide, claiming this will improve mental health support services for the armed forces and veterans.

From January 2020 until April 2020 Morgan was the Shadow Minister for Defence Procurement. The brief included the delivery of the equipment and support, nuclear enterprise, exports, cyber, innovation, science and technology, estates and environment and sustainability. In April 2020, the new leader of the Labour Party Keir Starmer appointed him as Shadow Minister for the Armed Forces. In October 2020, Morgan was elected co-chair of Labour Friends of the Forces.

Morgan has often criticised spending cuts to schools and colleges. He set up the "Inspiring Fratton" awards to inspire people from his home district to "aim high, work hard, and achieve their dreams".

In 2016 Morgan campaigned for the remain side in the EU referendum. The constituency narrowly voted to leave, with a split of 51.76% leave and 48.24% remain, reflecting the national result. Morgan was an early supporter of the People's Vote campaign arguing that the public should be given another chance to vote on Brexit. He vowed to lead the remain campaign in Portsmouth if this referendum had taken place.

He is an officer on the Key Cities APPG, Cycling APPG, and LGBT Labour, and a member of the Fabian Society.

Morgan has vowed to not report constituents to the Home Office for immigration enforcement.

In August 2020 Morgan was nominated for Patchwork Foundation's Member of Parliament of the Year award.

Personal life
Morgan lives in Southsea.

He is a patron of LGBT+ Labour  and is gay, having supported Portsmouth Pride for many years.

References

External links

Living people
Labour Party (UK) MPs for English constituencies
UK MPs 2017–2019
UK MPs 2019–present
Alumni of the University of Bristol
1981 births
English LGBT politicians
People educated at Priory School, Portsmouth
People educated at Portsmouth College
LGBT members of the Parliament of the United Kingdom
Gay politicians